Yentl may refer to:

 Yentl the Yeshiva Boy, short story by Isaac Bashevis Singer in Short Friday and Other Stories (1963)
 Yentl (play), 1975 play by Leah Napolin and Isaac Bashevis Singer based on the short story
 Yentl (film), 1983 American film based on the play
 Yentl (soundtrack), soundtrack album to the film

See also
 Yenta